The Noor is a long-range anti-ship cruise missile manufactured by Iran. The missile is in primary service with the Iranian Navy. The missile is a reverse engineered Chinese C-802 anti-ship missile.

History 

Iran was the first export customer of Chinese C-802 missiles. The contract was signed in 1995 but was cancelled due to U.S. pressure after 60 missiles had been delivered. After that, Iran started a program to reverse engineer the C-802.

It is unknown when the programme was finished, but in 2000 and early 2001, Iran tested an upgraded C-802 missile during Unity-79 wargames.

The missile is powered by Toloue-4, an Iranian version of the French Microturbo TRI 60 engine.

In January 2004, Iran announced that it has started manufacturing the DM-3B mono pulse radar for the Noor missile. According to Iranian officials, DM-3B is a millimeter-wave active radar used in the last stage of missile flight to find the target and home-in the missile on it. Because of its frequency, it is very hard to jam the radar, which is located inside the nosecone.

A video of the missile hitting its coastal target was published by the Iranian media.

In early 2012, during Velayete-90 wargames, a Noor missile was tested with improvements in electronic systems, a more jam-resistant radar and better target acquisition algorithms. A Qader missile was also tested in the wargame.

Variants 
Noor Phase 2: Improved version with  range.
Noor Phase 4: Better electronics and computer algorithms.

Operators 

 - 25 ordered in 2006 along with 6 Tir II (IPS 18) fast attack craft. 10 delivered between 2009 and 2010.

See also 
Military of Iran
Iranian military industry
Iran's missile forces
Current Equipment of the Iranian Army
SAHA

References

External links

Anti-ship missiles of Iran
Anti-ship cruise missiles
Islamic Republic of Iran Navy
Cruise missiles of Iran
Anti-ship cruise missiles of Iran
Military equipment introduced in the 2000s